{{DISPLAYTITLE:C20H34O}}
The molecular formula C20H34O (molar mass: 290.48 g/mol, exact mass: 290.2610 u) may refer to:

 Cembratrienol (CBTol)
 Geranylgeraniol
 Isotuberculosinol, also known as nosyberkol or edaxadiene

Molecular formulas